The 1971 Australian Manufacturers' Championship was a CAMS sanctioned Australian motor racing title open to Group E Series Production Touring Cars. The championship, which was the inaugural Australian Manufacturers' Championship, was won by General Motors-Holden's.

Calendar
The championship was contested over a five heat series, with each heat being a single race staged over a minimum duration of three hours.

Class Structure
Cars competed in five classes based on a Capacity / Price index in which the engine capacity in litres was multiplied by the retail price to determine the CP units for each model.
 Class A:  0-3,000 CP units
 Class B:  3,001-4,600 CP units
 Class C:  4,601-9,000 CP units
 Class D:  9,001-18,000 CP units
 Class E:  Over 18,000 CP units

Points system
Championship points were awarded on a 9-8-7-6-5-4-3-2-1 basis for the first nine positions in each class plus 4-3-2-1 for the first four positions outright. Only the best placed car from a manufacturer was eligible to score points.

Results

Note: Championship placings below second position are not known.

References

Australian Manufacturers' Championship
Manufacturers' Championship